Keltie Mayken Duggan (born September 7, 1970) is a former international breaststroke swimmer from Canada, who competed for her native country at the 1988 Summer Olympics in Seoul, South Korea.  There she won the bronze medal in the women's 4x100-metre medley relay, although she just swam in the preliminary heat.  The team for the final was formed by Lori Melien, Allison Higson, Jane Kerr and Andrea Nugent.

See also
 List of Olympic medalists in swimming (women)

References
 Canadian Olympic Committee
 

1970 births
Living people
Canadian female breaststroke swimmers
Commonwealth Games gold medallists for Canada
Olympic bronze medalists for Canada
Olympic swimmers of Canada
Pan American Games gold medalists for Canada
Swimmers from Edmonton
Swimmers at the 1987 Pan American Games
Swimmers at the 1988 Summer Olympics
Swimmers at the 1990 Commonwealth Games
Commonwealth Games medallists in swimming
Medalists at the 1988 Summer Olympics
Pan American Games medalists in swimming
Medalists at the 1987 Pan American Games
20th-century Canadian women
Medallists at the 1990 Commonwealth Games